A list of articles with mathematical proofs:

Theorems of which articles are primarily devoted to proving them

Bertrand's postulate and a proof
Estimation of covariance matrices
Fermat's little theorem and some proofs
Gödel's completeness theorem and its original proof
Mathematical induction and a proof
Proof that 0.999... equals 1
Proof that 22/7 exceeds π
Proof that e is irrational
Proof that π is irrational
Proof that the sum of the reciprocals of the primes diverges

Articles devoted to theorems of which a (sketch of a) proof is given

Banach fixed-point theorem
Banach–Tarski paradox
Basel problem
Bolzano–Weierstrass theorem
Brouwer fixed-point theorem
Buckingham π theorem (proof in progress)
Burnside's lemma
Cantor's theorem
Cantor–Bernstein–Schroeder theorem
Cayley's formula
Cayley's theorem
Clique problem (to do)
Compactness theorem (very compact proof)
Erdős–Ko–Rado theorem
Euler's formula
Euler's four-square identity
Euler's theorem
Five color theorem
Five lemma
Fundamental theorem of arithmetic
Gauss–Markov theorem (brief pointer to proof)
Gödel's incompleteness theorem
Gödel's first incompleteness theorem
Gödel's second incompleteness theorem
Goodstein's theorem
Green's theorem (to do)
Green's theorem when D is a simple region
Heine–Borel theorem
Intermediate value theorem
Itô's lemma
Kőnig's lemma
Kőnig's theorem (set theory)
Kőnig's theorem (graph theory)
Lagrange's theorem (group theory)
Lagrange's theorem (number theory)
Liouville's theorem (complex analysis)
Markov's inequality (proof of a generalization)
Mean value theorem
Multivariate normal distribution (to do)
Holomorphic functions are analytic
Pythagorean theorem
Quadratic equation
Quotient rule
Ramsey's theorem
Rao–Blackwell theorem
Rice's theorem
Rolle's theorem
Splitting lemma
squeeze theorem
Sum rule in differentiation
Sum rule in integration
Sylow theorems
Transcendence of e and π (as corollaries of Lindemann–Weierstrass)
Tychonoff's theorem (to do)
Ultrafilter lemma
Ultraparallel theorem
Urysohn's lemma
Van der Waerden's theorem
Wilson's theorem
Zorn's lemma

Articles devoted to algorithms in which their correctness is proved
Bellman–Ford algorithm (to do)
Euclidean algorithm
Kruskal's algorithm
Gale–Shapley algorithm
Prim's algorithm
Shor's algorithm (incomplete)

Articles where example statements are proved

Basis (linear algebra)
Burrows–Abadi–Needham logic
Direct proof
Generating a vector space
Linear independence
Polynomial
Proof
Pumping lemma
Simpson's rule

Other articles containing proofs

Accumulation point
Addition in N
associativity of addition in N
commutativity of addition in N
uniqueness of addition in N
Algorithmic information theory
Boolean ring
commutativity of a boolean ring
Boolean satisfiability problem
NP-completeness of the Boolean satisfiability problem
Cantor's diagonal argument
set is smaller than its power set
uncountability of the real numbers
Cantor's first uncountability proof
uncountability of the real numbers
Combinatorics
Combinatory logic
Co-NP
Coset
Countable
countability of a subset of a countable set (to do)
Angle of parallelism
Galois group
Fundamental theorem of Galois theory (to do)
Gödel number
Gödel's incompleteness theorem
Group (mathematics)
Halting problem
insolubility of the halting problem
Harmonic series (mathematics)
divergence of the (standard) harmonic series
Highly composite number
Area of hyperbolic sector, basis of hyperbolic angle
Infinite series
convergence of the geometric series with first term 1 and ratio 1/2
Integer partition
Irrational number
irrationality of log23
irrationality of the square root of 2
Mathematical induction
sum identity
Power rule
differential of xn
Product and Quotient Rules
Derivation of Product and Quotient rules for differentiating. 
Prime number
Infinitude of the prime numbers
Primitive recursive function
Principle of bivalence
no propositions are neither true nor false in intuitionistic logic
Recursion
Relational algebra (to do)
Solvable group
Square root of 2
Tetris
Algebra of sets
idempotent laws for set union and intersection

Articles which mention dependencies of theorems
Cauchy's integral formula
Cauchy integral theorem
Computational geometry
Fundamental theorem of algebra
Lambda calculus
Invariance of domain
Minkowski inequality
Nash embedding theorem
Open mapping theorem (functional analysis)
Product topology
Riemann integral
Time hierarchy theorem
Deterministic time hierarchy theorem

Articles giving mathematical proofs within a physical model
No-cloning theorem
Torque

See also
 Gödel's ontological proof
 Invalid proof
 List of theorems
 List of incomplete proofs
 List of long proofs

Proofs